Educating Niní (Spanish:Hay que educar a Niní) is a 1940 Argentine comedy film directed by Luis César Amadori and starring Niní Marshall, Francisco Álvarez and Pablo Palitos. The film's sets were designed by the art director Raúl Soldi.

Cast
 Niní Marshall as Niní 
 Francisco Álvarez  
 Pablo Palitos   
 Nuri Montsé   
 Héctor Calcaño   
 Cirilo Etulain   
 Carlos Lagrotta
 Elvira Quiroga
 Mecha López  
 Baby Correa
 Edna Norrell   
 Victoria Cuenca  
 Mirtha Legrand as Niní 
 Silvia Legrand   
 Delfy de Ortega

External links
 

1940 films
Argentine comedy films
1940s Spanish-language films
Argentine black-and-white films
1940 comedy films
Films directed by Luis César Amadori
1940s Argentine films